La Signora (an Italian phrase which can be translated to "the lady" in English) is a character in Commedia dell'arte. She is the wife of Pantalone and the mistress of Pedrolino. She is tough, beautiful and calculating, and wears very wide dresses along with very heavy makeup. She walks with a flick of the toe and her arms held far out to the sides of her body.

La Signora could be a "courtesan" (high class prostitute), but typically manages to wrangle her way into the household of an old man, usually Pantalone, where she would inevitably cuckold him. She was an older, sexually experienced Colombina, known as Rosaura.

 Appearance: Overdresses, wearing too many jewels, flowers, feathers, and ribbons and wearing too much hair and makeup.
 Physicality: Like Il Capitano, uses excessive and big gestures.
 Character Traits: Main aim is satisfaction of physical needs – more jewels, dresses and sex. She will scheme to have them assured. She has an immediate attraction to her counterpart, Il Capitano, and they must be together. However, she is married to Pantalone, and she cheats on him regularly.

A common lazzo of La Signora is to have a fight with another woman, as she is very proud and often ridicules others.

Popular culture
Representations of or characters based on La Signora in contemporary popular culture include Signora from Genshin Impact (where she was the Eighth of the Eleven Fatui Harbingers, and the first of them to die), and La Signora from the comic book series Power Man and Iron Fist, where she is a minor villain, part of the Commedia Dell'Morte.

References

Commedia dell'arte female characters
Fictional courtesans
Female stock characters